Moussa Bagayoko is a Malian footballer who plays Carabobo.

Career
Bagayoko started his career in Black Stars.

On 2 October 2020, he signed for F.C. Ashdod from the Israeli Premier League.

References

External links
 

1998 births
Living people
Malian footballers
Elazığspor footballers
Adanaspor footballers
F.C. Ashdod players
Hapoel Kfar Saba F.C. players
Carabobo F.C. players
Liga Leumit players
TFF First League players
Israeli Premier League players
Venezuelan Primera División players
Expatriate footballers in Turkey
Expatriate footballers in Israel
Expatriate footballers in Venezuela
Malian expatriate sportspeople in Turkey
Malian expatriate sportspeople in Israel
Malian expatriate sportspeople in Venezuela
Association football midfielders
21st-century Malian people